Dana Ciocarlie (born 26 November 1968) is a French pianist and teacher of music of Romanian origin.

Life 
Born in Bucharest, Ciocarlie began her musical studies at the Bucharest Conservatory and won her first prize in 1990. She came to work at the École normale de musique de Paris with Viktoria Melki (a student of Alfred Cortot) for her concert diploma, then perfected her skills with Dominique Merlet and Georges Pludermacher for two years at the Conservatoire de Paris as well as with Christian Zacharias and Dmitri Bashkirov.

She then participated in various competitions: winner of the Yamaha Foundation (1993), the Cziffra Foundation (1994), auditions of young artists in Leipzig (1995), and won the Pro Musicis prize in 1996 (prize of the Yvonne Lefébure foundation), the same year than the Robert Schumann International Competition for Pianists and Singers in Zwickau (2nd place) and the Géza Anda Competition the following year in Zurich (special Sándor Végh prize).

She has played with violinists Gilles Apap, Nicolas Dautricourt, Laurent Korcia, Irina Muresanu; pianists Christian Zacharias, Philippe Bianconi and Anne Queffélec; with violist Gérard Caussé and the Talich Quartet.

She has premiered numerous contemporary works dedicated to her by Édith Canat de Chizy, Karol Beffa, Nicolas Bacri, Stéphane Delplace, Dan Dediu, Jacques Lenot, Laurent Mettraux, Frédéric Verrières and Helena Winkelman.

Ciocarlie is a teacher at the Conservatoire national supérieur musique et danse de Lyon (chamber music) and the École normale de Paris.

Discography 
 Piano solo
 Marie Jaëll, Symphonic and piano music : Les beaux jours (12 piano pieces, world premiere recording) - Dana Ciocarlie, piano (2015, 3CDs Ediciones Singulares/Palazzetto Bru Zane-Centre de musique romantique française) , 
 Schubert, Sonatas D.960, 3 Klavierstücke D.946 (July 1996, L'Empreinte digitale 13054) 
 Schumann, Complete work for piano
 Romania: Paul Constantinescu, Enesco, Bartók (April 2000, L'Empreinte Digitale) 
 La langue maternelle: Bartók (Musiques nocturnes, Mikrokosmos extr.), Eötvös (Kosmos), Ligeti (Musica ricercata) (2005, L'Empreinte digitale) 
 Debussy en miroirs: Claude Debussy, Frédéric Verrières (Paraphrase), Karol Beffa (3 Études), Franck Krawczyk (Toccata), Thierry Escaich (Les Litanies de l'ombre) (Triton)
 Piano à quatre mains : invitation à la danse: Edvard Grieg, Hans Huber, Helena Winkelman, Max Bruch - Christiane Baume-Sanglard, Dana Ciocarlie piano (4-7 January 2015, Claves) 

 Chamber music
 Rubinstein, Sonate pour violon, Sonate pour alto - Pierre Franck (violon et alto) (décembre 2003, Arion/Pierre Verany PV704051) 
 Magnard and Lekeu: Sonatas for violin - Irina Muresanu, violin (15-18 December 2005, Ar Ré-Sé AR 2006-0) 
 Dvořák, Quintet with piano No 2 - Psophos Quartet (2007, Ar Ré-Sé) 
 Mendelssohn, Works for cello and piano - Sébastien van Kuijk, cello (Intrada)
 Bohémia : Janáček, Suk, Martinů, Mařatka - Marianne Piketty, violin (Integral Classics)
 Franck and Fauré, Sonatas for violin - Amanda Favier; violin (promotional record "Le Violon de l’ADAMI")

References

External links 
 Official website
 Biography on pianobleu.com
 

1967 births
Living people
Musicians from Bucharest
Romanian emigrants to France
Romanian classical pianists
20th-century French women classical pianists
21st-century French women classical pianists
Conservatoire de Paris alumni
École Normale de Musique de Paris alumni
Academic staff of the Conservatoire de Paris
Academic staff of the École Normale de Musique de Paris
Women music educators